Planet Pit is the sixth studio album by American rapper Pitbull. It was released on June 17, 2011, through Polo Grounds Music, Mr. 305 Entertainment, Sony Music, and J Records. The production on the album was handled by a variety of pop and hip hop producers including David Guetta, RedOne, Dr. Luke, Jim Jonsin, Benny Blanco, Soulshock, Afrojack, DJ Snake and Polow da Don. The album also features guest appearances by Vein, Ne-Yo, Afrojack, Nayer, Marc Anthony, T-Pain, Enrique Iglesias, Sean Paul, Chris Brown, Kelly Rowland, Jamie Drastik, DJ Frank E, Redfoo, David Rush, Jamie Foxx, David Guetta, Akon, Ludacris, Nicola Fasano, Nelly and Machel Montano. Musically, the album was created with the goal that every song on the album could serve as one single. The album is influenced by Pitbull's childhood years listening to merengue, freestyle, cha-cha-cha, Miami bass, hip hop and dancehall.

Planet Pit was supported by four singles: "Hey Baby (Drop It to the Floor)", "Rain Over Me", "International Love" and the US number one hit "Give Me Everything". The album received generally positive reviews from music critics and was a commercial success. The album debuted at number seven on the US Billboard 200, with first-week sales of 55,000 copies in the United States. This was Pitbull's final album for the J Records label, since the label would be discontinued during the summer of 2011.

Singles 
Planet Pit spawned four singles from the album's songs. The first single, "Hey Baby (Drop It to the Floor)" featuring T-Pain, was released on September 14, 2010. The song peaked at number seven on the US Billboard Hot 100, and number ten in Canada and Australia. The song was also used in the So Kodak advertising campaign by American technology company Kodak. The second single, "Give Me Everything" featuring Ne-Yo, Afrojack and Nayer, was released on March 17, 2011. The single peaked at number one on the US Billboard Hot 100, becoming Pitbull's first US number one single. Thea single also peaked at number on the charts in the UK and Canada, at number two in Germany, France, Spain and Australia, and number four in Italy. The third single, "Rain Over Me" featuring Marc Anthony, was released on June 8, 2011. The song peaked at number 30 on the US Billboard Hot 100, number one in Spain, number two in France, number seven in Germany and Canada, and number nine in Australia. The final single, "International Love" featuring Chris Brown, was released on November 1, 2011. The song peaked at number 13 on the US Billboard Hot 100, number three in Spain, number six in France, and number ten in the UK and Canada.

Promotional singles
"Pause" was released on June 7, 2011, as the album's first promotional single. The track was used to promote the Zumba fitness program via a video contest. The song debuted and peaked at number 73 on the US Billboard Hot 100.

"Shake Señora" was released on August 11, 2011, as the album's second promotional single. The song peaked at number 69 on the US Billboard Hot 100 and number 33 on the Canadian Hot 100.

Other songs
"Oye Baby" featuring Nicola Fasano was released on February 8, 2012.

"Alright" featuring Michael Montano was released on April 13, 2010. While the song was featured on the album Mr. Worldwide in the United States, the Japan exclusive version of Planet Pit consisted of the track.

Critical reception

The album received generally positive reviews from critics. On Metacritic, which assigns a normalized rating out of 100 to reviews from mainstream critics, the album received an average score of 70, based on twelve reviews, which indicates "Generally favorable reviews". Allison Stewart of The Washington Post gave Planet Pit a favorable review writing, "His new disc, “Planet Pit,” dispenses with the idea that pop albums should consist of a few celebrity-packed singles topped off with filler. Every song here is a superstar/super-producer collaboration, every song a banger" and referring to the album as "its own future Greatest Hits package." In his review for Us Magazine, Ian Drew gave the album three out of five stars and commented, "If you want a huge pop hit these days, get Pitbull to rap on it". He concluded, "So naturally, the Cuban MC, 30, calls in his own big A-list favors for his latest CD,  entirely of (what else?) pulsating club bangers." Robert Copsey of Digital Spy gave the album two out five stars, saying that "with another impressive rosta of guest vocalists and knob-twiddling boffs on board, there are a few - albeit, minor - sparks of joy to be found here", and concluded that "Planet Pit for the most part remains the usual mix of headache-inducing house-hip-hop and sleazy chat-up lines."

Rolling Stones Jody Rosen gave the album three out of five stars, writing "There are guest spots by R&B stars (Chris Brown) and Latin lovers (Enrique Iglesias). There are baldfaced rewrites of the Black Eyed Peas' "I Gotta Feeling" ("Give Me Everything") and Eminem's "Love the Way You Lie" ("Castle Made of Sand"). But there's something charming about Pitbull's enthusiasm - he sounds most like himself when he's promoting his brand." David Jeffries of AllMusic gave the album four out of five stars writing, "Solid hooks, polished production, cutting-edge tricks, and a star-studded guest list makes this a blockbuster thrill ride, but the reason Planet Pit retains its sense of fun through repeated listens is the man’s cool charisma and cheeky attitude" and concluding, "This is a hip-hop-flavored club effort of Elephunk proportions and another high-water mark for the don of pop-rap's glitter dome." The New York Times critic Jon Caramanica gave the album a positive review, calling the album the completion of Pitbull's "long transformation from crunk-era curio to dance-rap star", stating: "The music is ambitious and appealing, surrendering any claim to dignity in favor of huge, swelling progressions and stomping tempos. [...] It also serves as a warning for pop producers, who can now see that megaclub-friendly dance music — once held at arms length as a scourge of the Europeans — can be home for major American stars in a variety of genres".

Commercial performance
Planet Pit debuted at number seven on the US Billboard 200 chart, selling 55,000 copies in its first week. This became Pitbull's second US top-ten debut and his highest-charting album in the US. In its second week, the album dropped to number 14 on the chart, selling an additional 28,000 copies. As of September 2012, the album has sold 477,000 copies in the US. On October 16, 2020, the album was certified double platinum by the Recording Industry Association of America (RIAA) for combined sales and album-equivalent units of over two million units in the United States.

Track listing

Sample credits
 "Hey Baby (Drop It to the Floor)" contains a sample of "Push It" by Salt-n-Pepa.
 "Pause" contains a sample from "Bubble Gutz", as written by Abdesamad Ben Abdelouahid and performed by Apster.
 "Took My Love" contains a portion of the composition "Gypsy Woman (She's Homeless)", as written by Neal Conway and Crystal Waters and performed by Crystal Waters.
 "Oye Baby" contains a replayed sample from "Tombo in 7/4", as written by Airto Moreira.
 "Shake Señora" contains portions from "Jump in the Line" by Harry Belafonte.

Additional song info

"Hey Baby (Drop it to the Floor)" serves as track 4 to the hit album and features vocals from American singer T-Pain. It is the lead single to the album. Pitbull recorded his vocals at Al Burna Studios in Miami, FL while T-Pain recorded his vocals at Chevy Shack Studios in Atlanta, GA.

"Come N Go" serves as track 6 to the hit album and features guest vocals from long-time collaborator Enrique Iglesias. This song marks one of Pitbull and Enrique's many collaborations together. Pitbull recorded his vocals at Al Burna Studios in Miami, FL while Enrique Iglesias recorded his vocals at South Point Studios which is also located in Miami.

"Shake Senora" serves as track 7 to the hit album and features vocals from American singer T-Pain and Jamaican dancehall artist Sean Paul. It is a very popular dancehall that has Pitbull and Sean Paul both perform the two verses, T-Pain performs the chorus and the entire song is produced by French producer DJ Snake who is best known for his international smash hit "Turn Down for What" feat. Lil Jon. Pitbull recorded his vocals at Al Burna Studios, T-Pain recorded his vocals at Chevy Shack Studios and Sean Paul recorded his vocals at 2 Hard Studios in Jamaica.

"Castle Made of Sand" serves as track 9 to the hit album and is Pitbull's personal favorite track on the album since he dedicated the track to his mother. The track features guest vocals from Destiny's Child singer Kelly Rowland and New York rapper Jamie Drastik. Pitbull performs the first two verses, Kelly Rowland performs the chorus, Jamie Drastik performs the third and final verse to the song and the entire song is produced by American producer DJ Frank E who is best known for his international smash hit "Tonight (I'm F***in' You)" with Enrique Iglesias and Ludacris. Pitbull recorded his vocals at Al Burna Studios in Miami, Kelly recorded her vocals at Circle House Studios which is also located in Miami, and Jamie Drastik recorded his vocals at a studio in New York City. Pitbull published his own video on his YouTube channel for the song and currently has over 500K views. "Castle Made of Sand" marks the first collaboration between Pitbull and Kelly since they collaborate again a year later on Pitbull's album Global Warming on the track "That High".

"Where Do We Go" serves as track 11 to the album and features actor and singer Jamie Foxx. The original version features Chris Brown and Jamie Foxx. Chris Brown's vocals were replaced by Jamie Foxx's vocals in the final cut for unknown reasons.

"Something For the DJ's" serves as the 12th and final track to the hit album and features Afrojack and David Guetta who also produce the song while Pitbull recorded his vocals at Al Burna Studios in Miami, FL.

Charts

Weekly charts

Year-end charts

Certifications

Release history

References

External links
 Planet Pit on Spotify
 

2011 albums
Albums produced by Benny Blanco
Albums produced by David Guetta
Albums produced by DJ Frank E
Albums produced by Jim Jonsin
Albums produced by Dr. Luke
Albums produced by Polow da Don
Albums produced by RedOne
Pitbull (rapper) albums
J Records albums
Hip house albums
Dance-pop albums by American artists